William Frederick Witherington  (26 May 1785 – 10 April 1865) was an English painter and academic. Born in London, he entered the Royal Academy Schools in 1805. Except for one year he exhibited annually at the Royal Academy from 1811 until his death. He was elected A.R.A. on 1 November 1830 and R.A. on 10 February 1840. He retired as an academician on 28 May 1863.

His early works were mostly landscapes, but the influence of artists like George Morland (1763–1804) can be seen in the importance he gave to the figurative element in his paintings.

Witherington enjoyed painting English scenery and never travelled abroad. As with many of his works, he does not depict the harsh realities of rural life, but instead records incidents of family life. Like his contemporary, Augustus Wall Callcott, RA, he creates a composition with a lively foreground of figures and animals, combined with a landscape with distant vistas glimpsed through the wood.

He died on the 19th April, aged 79, and was buried on the eastern side of Highgate Cemetery. His grave (plot no.13865) no longer has a headstone or any marker.

References
 Samuel Redgrave, A Dictionary of Artists of the English School, London, 1878 (2nd Edition)

External links

 
W F Witherington online (ArtCyclopedia)
Gathering watercress on the Banks of the Mole, Surrey (1855 oil on canvas)
 Profile on Royal Academy of Arts Collections

1785 births
1865 deaths
Burials at Highgate Cemetery
19th-century English painters
English male painters
Landscape artists
Royal Academicians
Rother Valley artists
19th-century English male artists